Terry Denton (born 26 July 1950) is an Australian illustrator and author. He is married and has three children. He is the second youngest of five boys and was born and grew up in Melbourne, Victoria. Denton now lives in Mornington, Victoria.

Denton has written and illustrated more than 30 of his own books and illustrated numerous others for many notable Australian authors. His own books include the Gasp! series, which has been adapted into an animated TV series of the same name (and aired on Nine Network and ABC3). His art and designs contributed heavily to style and stories of the children's TV series Lift Off. 

Along with Andy Griffiths, Denton was a noted supporter of the September 2019 climate strikes.

Works

Author/Illustrator
 Felix and Alexander (1985)
 Gasp!
 Gasp! (1996)
 Zapt! (1997)
 Splat! (1998)
 Squish! (2005)
 Crash! (2006)
 Chomp! (2007)
 Storymaze
 The Ultimate Wave (2001)
 The Eye of Ulam (2001)
 The Wooden Cow (2002)
 The Golden Udder (2002)
 Minotaur's Maze (2003)
 The Obelisk of Eeeno (2003)
 It's True! Pigs Do Fly (2004)
 Squish! (2005)
 Wombat & Fox
 Wombat & Fox: Tales of the City (2006)
 Wombat & Fox: Summer in the City (2007)
 Wombat & Fox: Thrillseekers (2009)
 Terry Denton's Really Truly Amazing Guide to Everything (2020)

With Andy Griffiths
Denton has developed an enduring and very popular partnership with writer Andy Griffiths and together they have produced:
 The Day My Bum Went Psycho (2001)
 The Bad Book (2004)
 The Cat on the Mat Is Flat (2006)
 What Bumosaur is That? (2007)
 The Big Fat Cow That Goes Kapow (2008)
 The Very Bad Book (2010)
 What Body Part Is That? (2011)
 Once Upon A Slime (2013)
 The Cat, the Rat, and the Baseball Bat (2013)
 Ed and Ted and Ted’s Dog Fred (2015)
 The Just! Books
 Just Tricking! (1997)
Just Annoying! (1998)
 Just Stupid! (1999)
 Just Crazy! (2000)
 Just Disgusting! (2002)
 Just Wacky! (2004)
 Just Shocking! (2007)
 Just Macbeth! (2009)
 Just Doomed! (2012)
 The Treehouse Series
 The 13-Storey Treehouse (2011)
 The 26-Storey Treehouse (2012)
 The 39-Storey Treehouse (2013)
The 52-Storey Treehouse (2014)
The 65-Storey Treehouse (2015)
The Treehouse Fun Book (2016)
The 78-Storey Treehouse (2016)
The 91-Storey Treehouse (2017)
 The 117-Storey Treehouse (2019)
 The 130-Storey Treehouse (2021)
 The 143-Storey Treehouse (2022)

Illustration
Books by Mem Fox:
 Night Noises (1989)
 A Particular Cow (2006)

Books by Mark Greenwood:

 Jandamarra (2013)
 Boomerang & Bat (2016)
 Moonwalkers (2020)

Books by Paul Jennings and Ted Greenwood:
 Duck for Cover
 Freeze a crowd
 Spooner or Later

Books by Alison Lloyd:
 Wicked Warriors and Evil Emperors (2010)
 Dragons, Devils and Rebels (2017)
 The Upside-Down History of Down Under (2019)

Books by Natalie Jane Prior
 The Paw (1993)
 The Paw in Destination: Brazil (1995)
 The Paw in The Purple Diamond (1998)

Books by Gillian Rubinstein
 Mr Plunkett's pool  (1992)
 Jake and Pete (1995)
 Jake and Pete and the Stray Dogs  (1997)
 Ducky's Nest (1999)
 Jake & Pete and the Catcrowbats (1999)
 Jake and Pete and the Magpie's Wedding (2002)

Other books:
 The Worm Who Knew Karate, by Julie Lever (2015)

Notes

References
 Official website

1950 births
Australian comics writers
Australian illustrators
Living people
Writers who illustrated their own writing
Artists from Melbourne